Siikainen is a municipality of Finland.

It is located in the former province of Western Finland and is part of the Satakunta region. The municipal manager of Siikainen is Päivi Rantanen.

The municipality is unilingually Finnish.

References

External links

Municipality of Siikainen – Official website 

Municipalities of Satakunta
Populated places established in 1871
1871 establishments in Finland